The 2017–18 season will be Balmazújvárosi FC's 1st competitive season, 1st consecutive season in the OTP Bank Liga and 6th year in existence as a football club.

First team squad

Out to loan

Transfers

Summer

In:

Out:

Winter

In:

Out:

Statistics

Appearances and goals
Last updated on 2 June 2018.

|-
|colspan="14"|Youth players:

|-
|colspan="14"|Out to loan:

|-
|colspan="14"|Players no longer at the club:

|}

Top scorers
Includes all competitive matches. The list is sorted by shirt number when total goals are equal.

Last updated on 2 June 2018

Disciplinary record
Includes all competitive matches. Players with 1 card or more included only.

Last updated on 2 June 2018

Overall
{|class="wikitable"
|-
|Games played || 42 (33 OTP Bank Liga and 9 Hungarian Cup)
|-
|Games won || 14 (8 OTP Bank Liga and 6 Hungarian Cup)
|-
|Games drawn || 14 (12 OTP Bank Liga and 2 Hungarian Cup)
|-
|Games lost || 14 (13 OTP Bank Liga and 1 Hungarian Cup)
|-
|Goals scored || 56
|-
|Goals conceded || 52
|-
|Goal difference || +4
|-
|Yellow cards || 79
|-
|Red cards || 2
|-
||Worst discipline ||  Yuriy Habovda (10 , 1 )
|-
||Best result || 5–0 (H) v Békéscsaba - Hungarian Cup - 14-03-2018
|-
||Worst result || 0–5 (A) v Ferencváros - OTP Bank Liga - 10-03-2018
|-
|rowspan="2"|Most appearances ||  Eke Uzoma (39 appearances)
|-
|  Shandor Vayda (39 appearances)
|-
||Top scorer ||  Bachana Arabuli (12 goals)
|-
|Points || 56/126 (44.44%)
|-

Nemzeti Bajnokság I

Matches

League table

Results summary

Results by round

Hungarian Cup

References

External links
 Official Website
 UEFA
 fixtures and results

Balmazújvárosi FC seasons
Hungarian football clubs 2017–18 season